TeraPlast Arena is a multi-purpose arena located in the Wonderland complex on the Unirea in Bistrița, Romania. It is the home of Gloria Bistrița of the Liga Florilor MOL. 

Groundbreaking and construction began on October 18, 2019. The arena opened on August 12, 2022.

See also
 List of indoor arenas in Romania

References

2022 establishments in Romania
Sports venues completed in 2022
Music venues completed in 2022 
Bistrița
Handball venues in Romania
Indoor arenas in Romania
Sports venues in Romania
Music venues in Romania
Sport in Bistrița